= Life's Decay =

- Origin: France
- Genres: Darkwave; Folk; Industrial
- Years active: 2003–present
- Labels: Abstraktsens Produktions
- Members: Lyktwasst; Alea
- Website: www.lifesdecay.com

Life's Decay is a darkwave, folk, and industrial music group from France that features both French and English female vocals. Based in Paris, the project was born at the beginning of 2003. Until 2005, singer-songwriter Lyktwasst was alone in the center of the project; realizing everything, from the concept to the accomplishment. Since 2005, he has been working with Alea, a feminine singer and lyric writer. In 2008, she also started to work on the music with Lyktwasst by introducing classical acoustic instruments.

== Discography ==
Year	Title	Format
2003	Human Art Decay [first suicide]	mCD
2004	Art Decay Extremism	CD
2005	Anleva	CD
2006	Lysselia	CD
2007	Szilentia	CD
2008	Eklaasera	CD
2008	Lakasteasya	CD
2009	Dysrieuses	CD
2010	Dyssera	LP vinyl

== Music videos ==
Year	Title	Director
2003	"Art F"	Lyktwasst
2006	"Gloria"	Lyktwasst
2006	"Retroscape"	Lyktwasst
